Allon (a Hebrew language word meaning "oak tree") may refer to:

Allon (surname)
Allon, Georgia, a ghost town
Allon Road, named after Yigal Allon
Allon (village), an Israeli settlement east of Jerusalem, also named after Yigal Allon
Allon, the son of Jedaiah, of the family of the Simeonites, in the Bible
 Gim Allon, fictional superhero

See also 
 Aloni (disambiguation) 
 Elon (disambiguation)